Oklatheridium is an extinct genus of deltatheroidan.

References

Prehistoric metatherians
Cretaceous mammals of North America
Fossil taxa described in 2008
Prehistoric mammal genera